Rangatira Park is a suburb in the New Zealand town of Taupō.

The suburb is located just north of Nukuhau and south of Huka Falls, on a hill above Waikato River.

Residents of the suburb experienced an earthquake in September 2019.

Demographics
Rangitira Park is part of the Nukuhau-Rangatira Park statistical area.

References

Suburbs of Taupō
Populated places in Waikato
Populated places on the Waikato River